Chamaelaucium brevifolium is a member of the family Myrtaceae endemic to Western Australia.

It blooms between September and November producing white flowers.

Found on undulating plains in the northern Wheatbelt region of Western Australia where it grows in sandy soils over laterite.

References

brevifolium
Plants described in 1867